Irma may refer to:

People
 Irma (name), a female given name
 Irma (singer), full name Irma Pany, a Cameroonian female singer-songwriter

Places
 Irma, Alberta, Canada, a village
 Irma, Lombardy, Italy, a comune
 Irma, Wisconsin, USA, an unincorporated community
 177 Irma, a fairly large and dark main belt asteroid

Brands and enterprises
 Irma (supermarket), a Danish supermarket chain
 IRMA board, an early interface card for PCs and Macs
 Irma Hotel, a landmark built in Cody, Wyoming by "Buffalo Bill" Cody (it is still open for business as both a hotel and restaurant)
 Irma Records, an Italian record label

Other uses 

 Irma (dog), a Dickin Medal-winning dog
 Operation Irma, a series of airlifts of civilians during the Siege of Sarajevo
 SS Irma (1905), a Norwegian merchant ship sunk in controversial circumstances in 1944
 Tropical Storm Irma, various storms named Irma
 Hurricane Irma, the 9th named storm of the 2017 Atlantic hurricane season 
 Institute of Rural Management Anand
 Irma (steamship) (sank 1911, Costa Rica)

See also
 IRMA (disambiguation)
 Erma (disambiguation)